Martin Látal  (born March 17, 1988) is a Czech professional ice hockey forward currently playing with the Sheffield Steelers of the UK Elite Ice Hockey League (EIHL). He was selected by the Phoenix Coyotes in the 5th round (131st overall) of the 2006 NHL Entry Draft.

Látal first played with HC Kladno in the Czech Extraliga during the 2005–06 Czech Extraliga season.

References

External links

1988 births
Living people
Arizona Coyotes draft picks
BK Mladá Boleslav players
Czech ice hockey forwards
HC Dynamo Pardubice players
HC Karlovy Vary players
Rytíři Kladno players
Stadion Hradec Králové players
HC Plzeň players
P.E.I. Rocket players
HC Sparta Praha players
Sheffield Steelers players
Sportspeople from Kladno
Czech expatriate ice hockey players in Canada
Czech expatriate sportspeople in England
Expatriate ice hockey players in England